Gustav Nyquist (born 1 September 1989) is a Swedish professional ice hockey forward for the Minnesota Wild of the National Hockey League (NHL). Nyquist was drafted 121st overall by the Detroit Red Wings in the 2008 NHL Entry Draft, with whom he spent the first portion of his NHL career. He also briefly played for the San Jose Sharks, as well as the Columbus Blue Jackets.

Early life
Nyquist was born in Halmstad in southern Sweden. He and his family later moved to the city of Malmö, where Nyquist began playing hockey for a local youth team, Limhamn Hockey. He later joined the Malmö Redhawks organization, playing for their under −16, −18 and −20 teams. After graduating from high school with top grades, he moved to the town of Orono, Maine, to continue his academic and hockey career at the University of Maine, where he played for the Black Bears.

Playing career

Amateur
Nyquist played in the Malmö Redhawks' organization and represented Scania in the 2006 TV-pucken tournament, where Scania finished second to Gothenburg.

Nyquist played three seasons for the University of Maine's Black Bears of the NCAA's Hockey East conference. He led the team in points in all of his three seasons, and was the NCAA's regular season scoring leader in the 2009–10 season. In 2010, he was a Hobey Baker Award finalist in 2010, eventually edged-out by the University of Wisconsin's Blake Geoffrion. Nyquist left the Black Bears after his junior year, signing a two-year, entry-level contract with the Detroit Red Wings, the team that drafted him 121st overall in 2008, on 25 March 2011.

Professional

Detroit Red Wings
Nyquist made his professional hockey debut with the Red Wings' American Hockey League (AHL) affiliate, the Grand Rapids Griffins, on 25 March 2011, in a game against the Texas Stars. In his second AHL game, on 26 March, also against Texas Stars, he scored his first AHL goal on an assist from Jamie Tardif.

Gustav made his NHL debut with Detroit on 1 November 2011, in a game against the Minnesota Wild. On 26 March 2012, he scored his first career NHL goal against Steve Mason of the Columbus Blue Jackets.

Nyquist made his Stanley Cup playoff debut on 13 April 2012, against the Nashville Predators. He was re-called from Grand Rapids after forward Darren Helm suffered a deep gash to his right forearm in Game 1, when he was cut by the skate blade of Alexander Radulov, leading to season-ending surgery.

During the lockout-shortened 2012–13 season, his second professional campaign, Nyquist recorded three goals and three assists in 22 regular season games for the Red Wings. In Game 2 of the 2013 Stanley Cup playoffs, Nyquist scored a game-winning overtime goal against the Anaheim Ducks to even the series at 1–1. He also scored the first goal in Game 3 of the 2013 Western Conference Semi-finals against the Chicago Blackhawks, though Chicago would eventually defeat Detroit and emerge as Stanley Cup champions. In 14 playoff games, Nyquist recorded two goals and three assists.

In addition to his NHL contributions for 2012–13, Nyquist was also the leading-scorer for the Grand Rapids Griffins' season, recording 23 goals and 37 assists in 60 regular season games. After the Red Wings were eliminated from the playoffs, Nyquist joined the Griffins during the 2013 Calder Cup playoffs. He recorded two goals and five assists in 10 AHL playoff games to help lead the Griffins to the Calder Cup championship. Nyquist was named the Detroit Red Wings rookie of the year at the conclusion of the season by the Detroit Sports Broadcasters' Association.

On 20 August 2013, prior to the beginning of the 2013–14 season, the Red Wings signed Nyquist to a two-year, $1.9 million contract extension. On 2 February 2014, Nyquist registered his first career hat-trick in a game against the Washington Capitals. On 24 March 2014, Nyquist was named NHL's First Star of the Week; he led all NHL players with six goals and tied for the League lead with seven points in four games, helping the Red Wings earn seven of a possible eight points. Nyquist was also named the NHL Second Star of the Month for March. He finished the month with the second-most goals, 12, and was tied for fifth with 18 points to help the Red Wings post a 7–6–2 record and move into the first wild card spot in the Eastern Conference. Nyquist scored in nine of 15 games, including a six-game goal streak, the longest by a Red Wing since 2010. Nyquist registered three two-goal games in March, and posted a career-high four-point night on 7 March.

Nyquist finished the 2013–14 season with a team-leading 28 goals, in addition to 20 assists, in 57 games played for the Red Wings. He also led all NHL skaters with 23 goals from 20 January until the end of the regular season. With six game-winning goals, he became the youngest player to lead the Red Wings in that statistic since a 24-year-old Sergei Fedorov led the Red Wings with ten in 1993–94. On 15 October 2014, Nyquist played in his 100th career NHL game. He became the first Red Wing to score 35 or more goals in his first 100 career NHL games since Vyacheslav Kozlov recorded 37 goals for Detroit between the 1991–92 and 1993–94 seasons.

Following the 2014–15 NHL season Nyquist became a restricted free agent under the NHL Collective Bargaining Agreement. The Red Wings made him a qualifying offer to retain his NHL rights and on 5 July 2015, Nyquist filed for salary arbitration. On 10 July 2015, the Red Wings signed Nyquist to a four-year, $19 million contract extension.

On 15 February 2017, Nyquist was suspended for six games for dangerously high-sticking Minnesota Wild defenseman Jared Spurgeon in the face during a game between the two teams that took place three days earlier.

San Jose Sharks
On 24 February 2019, Nyquist was traded to the San Jose Sharks in exchange for a second-round pick in the 2019 NHL Entry Draft and a conditional third-round pick in the 2020 NHL Entry Draft.

He scored six goals with five assists during 19 regular season games with his new team, and contributed one goal and ten assists during the 2019 Stanley Cup playoffs as the Sharks advanced to the Western Conference Finals, losing to the eventual Stanley Cup Champion St. Louis Blues.

Columbus Blue Jackets
On 1 July 2019, Nyquist left the Sharks as a free agent and signed a four-year, $22 million contract with the Columbus Blue Jackets. Nyquist finished his first season as a Blue Jacket with 42 points in 70 games.

On 4 November 2020, it was announced that Nyquist underwent surgery on his left shoulder to address a labral tear and would miss 5-6 months. Nyquist missed the entire 2020–21 season with this injury, and the Blue Jackets did not make the playoffs.

Minnesota Wild
Approaching the trade deadline with the Blue Jackets in last place in the league, and while still recovering from injury, Nyquist was traded by Columbus to the Minnesota Wild in exchange for a 2023 fifth-round pick on 28 February 2023.

International play

Nyquist was selected as a replacement for Red Wing teammate Johan Franzén to represent Sweden at the 2014 Winter Olympics in Sochi, Russia, where he won a silver medal.

Nyquist represented Sweden at the 2014 IIHF World Championship, where he recorded four goals and two assists in ten games, and won a bronze medal.

Nyquist represented Sweden at the 2016 IIHF World Championship, where he was the leading scorer for Sweden, recording seven goals and one assist in eight games. His seven goals was tied with Patrik Laine for the tournament lead.

Nyquist represented Sweden at the 2018 IIHF World Championship, where he recorded four goals and one assist in nine games, and won a gold medal.

Personal
Gustav has a brother, Oscar Nyquist, who has played junior hockey for the Wilkes-Barre/Scranton Knights of the Eastern Hockey League (EHL). He was selected to play for Team Sweden in the 2015 Winter Universiade held in Granada, Spain.

The Thoroughbred race horse Nyquist, winner of the 2016 Kentucky Derby, was named in honor of Gustav Nyquist by the owner, J. Paul Reddam, who is a fan of the Red Wings.

Career statistics

Regular season and playoffs

International

Awards and achievements

References

External links

1989 births
Living people
Columbus Blue Jackets players
Detroit Red Wings draft picks
Detroit Red Wings players
Grand Rapids Griffins players
Ice hockey players at the 2014 Winter Olympics
Maine Black Bears men's ice hockey players
Medalists at the 2014 Winter Olympics
Olympic ice hockey players of Sweden
Olympic medalists in ice hockey
Olympic silver medalists for Sweden
Sportspeople from Halmstad
San Jose Sharks players
Swedish expatriate ice hockey players in the United States
Swedish ice hockey left wingers
AHCA Division I men's ice hockey All-Americans
Sportspeople from Halland County